Gerhard Haidacher (born 29 April 1963) is an Austrian bobsledder who competed in the late 1980s and early 1990s. He won a gold medal in the four-man event with teammates Ingo Appelt, Harald Winkler and Thomas Schroll at the 1992 Winter Olympics in Albertville.

Haidacher also earned a silver medal in the four-man event at the 1993 FIBT World Championships in Igls.

References
Bobsleigh four-man Olympic medalists for 1924, 1932-56, and since 1964
Bobsleigh four-man world championship medalists since 1930
DatabaseOlympics.com profile.

1963 births
Austrian male bobsledders
Bobsledders at the 1992 Winter Olympics
Bobsledders at the 1994 Winter Olympics
Living people
Olympic bobsledders of Austria
Olympic gold medalists for Austria
Olympic medalists in bobsleigh
Medalists at the 1992 Winter Olympics